11-M, para que nadie lo olvide (English: 11-M, never forget) was a Spanish TV mini-series which was aired in Telecinco in 2011.  Two episodes were broadcast.

The mini-series narrates how the 2004 Madrid train bombings were planned and unfolded.

Cast
 Abdelatif Hwidar
 Zoe Berriatúa
 Paco Manzanedo
 Kaabil S. Ettaquil
 Alil El Aziz
 Irene Arcos
 Monica Rodríguez Caballero
 Marta Codina
 Younes Bachir

References

2011 Spanish television series debuts
2011 Spanish television series endings
2010s Spanish drama television series
Spanish television series about terrorism
Telecinco network series